Viktor Hübl (born 12 August 1978) is a Czech professional ice hockey player and former National Team member. Hübl played with HC Litvínov in the Czech Extraliga during the 2010–11 Czech Extraliga season.

He was selected by the Washington Capitals in the 9th round (284th overall) of the 2001 NHL Entry Draft.

His uncle and cousin, both named Jaroslav Hübl, were also professionals in the sport.

Career statistics

References

External links

1978 births
Czech ice hockey centres
HC Litvínov players
HC Slavia Praha players
Living people
Motor České Budějovice players
Washington Capitals draft picks
Sportspeople from Chomutov